Sam Forko (born 2 September 1978) is a Liberian former footballer who played as a defender with the New York MetroStars in Major League Soccer. Forko was drafted in the 2002 MLS SuperDraft with the 30th pick out of the University of Connecticut. He played in 9 games with the MetroStars, starting 3 before being released. He is the brother of fellow Connecticut alumnus and Liberian international footballer Willis Forko.

Sources
 Sam Forko MetroFanatic.com

1978 births
Living people
Liberian footballers
Liberian expatriate footballers
Major League Soccer players
UConn Huskies men's soccer players
New York Red Bulls players
University of Connecticut alumni
Expatriate soccer players in the United States
New York Red Bulls draft picks

Association football defenders